Lenjan may refer to:
 Lenjan County, in Isfahan County